Marco Bruno Bodini (born 24 October 1972) is an Italian sailor. He competed in the Tornado event at the 2000 Summer Olympics.

References

External links
 

1972 births
Living people
Italian male sailors (sport)
Olympic sailors of Italy
Sailors at the 2000 Summer Olympics – Tornado
Sportspeople from Trieste